Serie D was established in 1948. Only in 32 of its 70 editions, however, provided for a final phase to award a national category title: this took place between 1952 and 1957 with the Scudetto IV Serie, in the year 1957–58 with the title of Lega Interregionale, from 1992–99 with the Scudetto Dilettanti, and since 1999 with the current Serie D. The record of victories of the category championship is held by Siena, winning twice in 1955–56 and 2014–15.

Champions

Scudetto IV Serie
1952–53: Catanzaro
1953–54: Bari
1954–55: Colleferro
1955–56: Siena
1956–57: Sarom Ravenna

Campionato Interregionale
1957–58: Cosenza, Ozo Mantova & Spezia (ex-aequo)
1959–60 to 1961–62: Title awarded to the winning groups of Prima Categoria
1962–63 to 1991–92: Title not awarded

Scudetto Dilettanti
1992–93: Eurobuilding Crevalcore
1993–94: Pro Vercelli
1994–95: Taranto
1995–96: Castel San Pietro 
1996–97: Biellese
1997–98: Giugliano
1998–99: Lanciano

Serie D
1999–2000: Sangiovannese
2000–01: Palmese
2001–02: Olbia
2002–03: Cavese
2003–04: Massese
2004–05: Bassano Virtus
2005–06: Paganese
2006–07: Tempio 
2007–08: Aversa Normanna
2008–09: Pro Vasto
2009–10: Montichiari
2010–11: Cuneo
2011–12: Venezia
2012–13: Ischia
2013–14: Pordenone
2014–15: Robur Siena
2015–16: Viterbese
2016–17: Monza
2017–18: Pro Patria
2018–19: Avellino
2019–20: Not awarded
2020–21: Not awarded
2021–22: Recanatese

Promotions
1952–53: Carrarese, Lecco, Catanzaro, Carbosarda
1953–54: Cremonese, Bolzano, Bari, Prato
1954–55: Vigevano, Mestrina, BPD Colleferro, Molfetta
1955–56: Biellese, Reggiana, Siena, Reggina
1956–57: Pro Vercelli, SAROM Ravenna, Chinotto Neri Roma
1957–58: 21 teams
1958–59: Savona, Bolzano, Vis Sauro Pesaro, Pistoiese, Sassari Torres, Maceratese, Crotone
1959–60: Entella Chiavari, Saronno, Cesena, Viareggio, Bisceglie, San Vito Benevento
1960–61: Empoli, Ivrea, Vittorio Veneto, Grosseto, Portacivitanoves, Potenza
1961–62: Rapallo Ruentes, Rizzoli Milano, C.R.D.A. Monfalcone, Solvay Rosignano, Trani, Avellino
1962–63: Carrarese, Solbiatese, Vis Sauro Pesaro, Empoli, Maceratese, Casertana
1963–64: Entella Chiavari, Piacenza, Carpi, Ternana, Avellino, Crotone
1964–65: Jesi, Massese, Nardò, Rapallo Ruentes, Savoia Torre Annunziata, Trevigliese
1965–66: Barletta, Frosinone, Massiminiana Catania, Verbania, Spezia, Vis Sauro Pesaro
1966–67: Bolzano, Chieti, Città di Castello, Internapoli, Pavia, Pontedera
1967–68: Macobi Asti, Cremonese, Sottomarina, Forlì, Viareggio, Olbia, Matera, Brindisi, Marsala
1968–69: Derthona, Seregno, Rovereto, Imola, Lucchese, Latina, Sorrento, Pro Vasto, Acquapozzillo 
1969–70: Imperia, Parma, Trento, Maceratese, Aquila Montevarchi, Viterbese, Savoia Torre Annunziata, Martina Franca, Enna
1970–71: Pro Vercelli, Cremonese, Belluno, Giulianova, Sangiovannese, Frosinone, Turris, Trani, Siracusa
1971–72: Cossatese, Vigevano, Triestina, Ravenna, Aquila Montevarchi, Torres Sassari, Juventus Stabia, Barletta, Trapani
1972–73: Gaviese, Bolzano, Clodiasottomarina, Riccione, Grosseto, Latina, Nocerina, Pescara, Marsala
1973–74: Juniorcasale, Sant'Angelo Lodigiano, Mestrina, Carpi, Sangiovannese, Cynthia Genzano, Benevento, Teramo, Messina
1974–75: Albese, Pro Patria, Treviso, Anconitana, Pistoiese, Olbia, Potenza, Campobasso, Cosenza
1975–76: Biellese, Pergocrema, Triestina, Fano Alma Juventus, Siena, Viterbese, Paganese, Matera, Alcamo
1976–77: Omegna, Trento, Audace San Michele, Forlì, Prato, Latina, Chieti, Pro Cavese, Ragusa
1977–78: Imperia, Savona, Derthona, Albese, Pavia, Legnano, Fanfulla, Vigevano, Monselice, Mestrina, Conegliano, Adriese, Carpi, Vis Pesaro, Civitanovese, Osimana, Carrarese, Montecatini, Montevarchi, Sangiovannese, Almas Roma, LVPA Frascati, Avezzano, Cral Banco di Roma, Formia Club, Casertana, Rende, Palmese, Gallipoli, Lanciano, Potenza, Monopoli, Vittoria, Nuova Igea, Vigor Lamezia, Alcamo, Sanremese, Rhodense, Anconitana, Cerretese, Viareggio, Frosinone, Civitavecchia, Savoia, Cassino, Francavilla, Cosenza, Messina
1978–79: Arona, Aurora Desio, Pordenone, Venezia, Città di Castello, Sansepolcro, Pietrasanta, Rondinella Marzocco, Squinzano, L'Aquila, Juventus Stabia, Terranova Gela
1979–80: Torretta Santa Caterina, Omegna, Casatese, Mira, Maceratese, Cattolica, Sant'Elena Quartu, Casalotti, Virtus Casarano, Martina Franca, Frattese, Campania
1980–81: Imperia, Vogherese, Virescit Boccaleone, Montebelluna, Vigor Senigallia, Jesi, Torres, Frosinone, Ercolanese, Casoria, Akragas, Modica
1981–82: Asti T.S.C., Ospitaletto, Pro Gorizia, Ravenna, Pontedera, Elpidiense, Foligno, Grumese, Gioiese, Gioventù Brindisi, Licata, Carbonia
1982–83: Biellese, Brembillese, Venezia, Centese, Massese, Cesenatico, Lodigiani Roma, Ischia Isolaverde, Afragolese, Pro Italia Galatina, Uva Italia Canicattì, Olbia
1983–84: Pro Vercelli, Virescit Boccaleone, Euromobil Pievigina, Sassuolo, Montevarchi, Fermana, Aesernia, Gladiator, Crotone, Fidelis Andria, Nissa, Nuorese
1984–85: Cairese, Leffe, Orceana, Giorgione, Entella Bacezza, Ravenna, Pro Cisterna, Angizia, Nola, Juventus Stabia, Trapani, Sorso
1985–86: Casale, Oltrepò, Paluani Chievo, Moa Suzzara, Cuoiopelli, Vis Pesaro, Latina, Lanciano, Rifo Sud, Bisceglie, Giarre, Olbia
1986–87: Saviglianese, Pro Sesto, Intim Helen, Riccione, Sarzanese 1906, Gubbio, Olimpia Celano, Chieti, Vigor Lamezia, Kroton, Atletico Catania, Tempio
1987–88: Juventus Domo, Oltrepò, Orceana, San Marino, Cecina, Poggibonsi, Cynthia, Trani, Battipagliese, Fasano, Juventina Gela, Ilvamarisardegna, Carpi, Potenza
1988–89: Cuneo '80, Solbiatese, Valdagno, Cittadella, Baracca Lugo, Mobilieri Ponsacco, C.E.P., Ostiamare, La Palma, Altamura, Adelaide Nicastro, Acireale
1989–90: Finlocat Fiorenzuola, Saronno, Leffe, Euromobil Pievigina, Viareggio, Vastese, Astrea, Formia, Sangiuseppese, Savoia, Enna, Lecco, Molfetta
1990–91: Pistoiese, Aosta, Cerveteri, Avezzano, Juve Stabia, Matera
1991–92: Giorgione, Oltrepò, Gualdo, Sora, Akragas (as Agrigento Hinterland)
1992–93: Legnano, Cittadella, Vogherese, Eurobuilding Crevalcore, Nuova Maceratese, Sassari Torres, Fasano, Trapani, Battipagliese, Lumezzane, Livorno, Forlì, L'Aquila
1993–94: Pro Vercelli, Varese, Brescello, Sandonà, Vis Pesaro, Teramo, Giulianova, Benevento, Castrovillari
1994–95: Grosseto, Gallaratese, Alzano Virescit, Treviso, Viterbese, Tolentino, Marsala, Taranto, Catania
1995–96: Pisa, Vogherese, Iperzola, Mestre, Arezzo, Maceratese, Caserta, Altamura, Juveterranova Gela
1996–97: Viareggio, Biellese, Albinese, Mantova, Castel San Pietro, Astrea, Cavese, Tricase, Crotone
1997–98: Sanremese, Borgosesia, Trento, Faenza, Gubbio, L'Aquila, Giugliano, Nardò, Messina Peloro, Sassuolo
1998–99: Imperia, Meda, Montichiari, Imolese, Rondinella Impruneta, Castelnuovo, Lanciano, Fasano, Sant'Anastasia
1999–2000: Moncalieri, Legnano, Südtirol-Alto Adige, Russi, Sangiovannese, San Marino, Puteolana, Campobasso, Igea Virtus, Taranto
2000–01: Valenzana, Pavia, Thiene, Poggese, Poggibonsi, Sambenedettese, Palmese, Martina, Paternò, Trento, Frosinone
2001–02: Savona, Olbia, Pordenone, Aglianese, Fano, Tivoli, Gladiator, Brindisi, Ragusa, Forlì, Grosseto, Latina
2002–03: Pizzighettone, Ivrea, Bellunopontalpi, Ravenna, Cappiano Romaiano, Rosetana, Isernia, Melfi, Cavese, Palazzolo, Bellaria Igea Marina, Sansovino, Tolentino, Rutigliano, Vittoria
2003–04:  Massese, Casale, Carpenedolo, Portosummaga, Castel San Pietro, Morro d'Oro, Juve Stabia, Manfredonia, Rende, Sanremese, Calcio Potenza, Pro Vasto, Vigor Lamezia
2004–05: Cuneo, Bassano Virtus, Città di Jesolo, Città di Lecco, Pergocrema, Rieti, Foligno, Real Marcianise, Gallipoli, Modica
2005–06: Varese, Nuorese, Boca San Lazzaro, Rovigo, Poggibonsi, Val di Sangro, Cassino, Paganese, Sorrento, Vibonese, Monopoli, Celano
2006–07: Canavese, U.S.O. Calcio, Mezzocorona, Rodengo Saiano, Esperia Viareggio, Valle del Giovenco, Scafatese, Noicattaro, Neapolis
2007–08: Alessandria, Como, Itala San Marco, Giacomense, Figline, Sangiustese, Isola Liri, San Felice Normanna, Fortitudo Cosenza, Alghero, Colligiana, Montichiari, Sambonifacese, Barletta
2008–09: Spezia, P.B. Vercelli, Sacilese, Crociati Noceto, FeralpiSalò, Sporting Lucchese, Pro Vasto, Fano, Villacidrese, Brindisi, Siracusa, Nocerina, Vico Equense
2009–10: Savona, Tritium, Montichiari, Pisa, Gavorrano, Chieti, Fondi, Neapolis Mugnano, Milazzo, Virtus Entella, Casale, Renate, Carpi, L'Aquila, Pomezia, Matera, Trapani, Vigor Lamezia, Avellino
2010–11: Cuneo, Mantova, Treviso, Borgo a Buggiano, Perugia, Santarcangelo, Aprilia, Arzanese, Ebolitana, Rimini
2011–12: V.d.A. Saint-Christophe, Sterilgarda Castiglione, Venezia, Forlì, Pontedera, Teramo, Salerno, Martina Franca, HinterReggio
2012–13: Bra, Pergolettese, Delta Porto Tolle, Tuttocuoio, Castel Rigone, Torres, Ischia, Messina, Virtus Verona, Real Vicenza, Casertana, Foggia, Cosenza, SPAL (after merger)
2013–14: Giana Erminio, Pro Piacenza, Pordenone, Lucchese, Pistoiese, Ancona, Lupa Roma, Matera, Savoia, Arezzo
2014–15: Cuneo, Padova, Rimini, Robur Siena, Maceratese, Lupa Castelli Romani, Fidelis Andria, Monopoli, Akragas
2015–16: Piacenza, Venezia, Parma, Gubbio, Sambenedettese, Viterbese, Virtus Francavilla, Siracusa, Fano, Fondi, Forlì, Olbia, Reggina, Taranto, Vibonese
2016–17: Cuneo, Monza, Mestre, Ravenna, Gavorrano, Fermana, Arzachena, Bisceglie, Sicula Leonzio, Triestina, Rende
2017–18: Gozzano, Pro Patria, Virtus Verona, Rimini, Albissola, Vis Pesaro, Rieti, Potenza, Vibonese, Imolese, Pro Cavese
2018–19: Lecco, Como, ArzignanoChiampo, Pianese, Cesena, Picerno, Bari, Avellino, Pergolettese
2019–20: Lucchese, Pro Sesto, Campodarsego, Mantova, Grosseto, Matelica, Turris, Bitonto, Palermo
2020–21: Seregno, Trento, Fiorenzuola, Montevarchi, Campobasso, Monterosi, Taranto, ACR Messina
 2021–22 - Novara F.C., Sangiuliano, Arzignano Valchiampo, Rimini, San Donato Tavarnelle, Recanatese, Giugliano, Audace Cerignola, Gelbison.

Footnotes

Serie D
champions and promotions